Giovanni Lapentti Gómez (born 25 January 1983) is retired Ecuadorian tennis player. His brother is Nicolás Lapentti, another professional tennis player, while a third brother, Leonardo, has also been active at the lower levels of professional tennis.

Personal life
Lapentti married Andrea Gómez Miss Venezuela 2004 in 2011 and became a father in 2012.

Tennis career

2002-2004
Lapentti announced his ATP debut in 2002, but he actually had his first tour match in 2003, at the Franklin Templeton Classic in Scottsdale, Arizona, United States. Lapentti obtained his first professional victory at that tournament's first round, defeating Paradorn Srichaphan, 7–6 (7–2), 6–2. He lost in the tournament's second round to David Sánchez.

He participated in 2003's Italian and French Open, losing in the first round both times. During the French Open, he was tied at 2 sets apiece with Tommy Robredo but had to retire in the fifth set due to an injury, which did not allow him to return to the professional men's tennis tour until 2004.

Lapentti did not obtain a single victory during his second year as a professional, but he participated in tournaments held in Argentina, Mexico, Spain and Indian Wells, California.

2005-2013
Lapentti had better results in 2005, losing in the Davis Cup playoffs to Jürgen Melzer (he only played one Davis Cup game that year), advancing to the second round of the Legg Mason Classic, where he was defeated by Andy Roddick, getting to an ATP's tournament's third round for the first time in his career when he participated at the RCA Championships (losing to Paul Goldstein in the third round), making the second round of the Campbell's Hall of Fame Championship and the third round of the Tennis Channel Open. The only tournament that he participated in and failed to reach the second round during 2005 was the Pacific Life Open in Indian Wells, where he lost to Kevin Kim.

Lapentti was eliminated in the first round of 2006's Pacific Life Open, that time by Mardy Fish. In June 2008 Lapentii won the Manta Open and had accomplished his goal also winning Costa Rica Seguros Bolivar Open in March 2011.

References

External links

cbs.sportsline.com

1983 births
Living people
Ecuadorian expatriates in the United States
Ecuadorian male tennis players
Ecuadorian people of Italian descent
Ecuadorian people of Spanish descent
Sportspeople from Guayaquil
Wimbledon junior champions
Tennis players at the 2015 Pan American Games
Grand Slam (tennis) champions in boys' doubles
South American Games medalists in tennis
South American Games gold medalists for Ecuador
Competitors at the 1998 South American Games
Pan American Games competitors for Ecuador
21st-century Ecuadorian people